The Pungume Lighthouse is located on Pungume Island at the south western tip of the Zanzibar Archipelago, in Tanzania. The Lighthouse is a squared stone tower recently painted with black and white stripes. The lighthouse is an important one as it shines into the channel where ships enter the Stone Town harbor. The lighthouse is managed and operated by the Zanzibar Ports Corporation.

See also

List of lighthouses in Tanzania

References

External links 
 Tanzania Ports Authority

Lighthouses in Tanzania
Lighthouses completed in 1919
Buildings and structures in Zanzibar